Troon railway station is a railway station serving the town of Troon, South Ayrshire, Scotland. The station is managed by ScotRail and is on the Ayrshire Coast Line.

History 
The station was opened by the Glasgow and South Western Railway on 2 May 1892, replacing the earlier station of the same name to the east which closed on the same day.

Troon station consists of two side platforms with buildings designed by the architect James Miller. 

The station was refurbished in spring 2004 ready for the 2004 Open Golf Championship at the nearby Royal Troon Golf Club. During the week-long event, including practice days, Troon Station saw an estimated 100,000 extra passengers.

2021 fire
On 17 July 2021, when the station was unstaffed, a fire severely damaged the station building at platform 1, including the ticket office, a hairdresser and a café. Damage to the overhead wires led to suspension of service between Kilwinning and Ayr until 23 July 2021 and suspension of service at Troon until the structures could be rendered safe. The station reopened in late July 2021.

Services

December 2022 

Monday - Saturday:
Four trains per hour to 
Ten trains to Kilmarnock, running a two hourly frequency (with extras), two of these continue to Glasgow Central via )

Sundays:
Two trains per hour to Glasgow
Two trains per hour to Ayr

Passengers can change at Ayr for services to Stranraer, or at Glasgow for services to Kilmarnock.

Ferry to Larne 
There are footpaths throughout.

References

Notes

Sources

External links
Video footage of Troon Station in 2016, YouTube

Railway stations in South Ayrshire
Former Glasgow and South Western Railway stations
Railway stations in Great Britain opened in 1892
Railway stations served by ScotRail
SPT railway stations
Railway stations serving harbours and ports in the United Kingdom
James Miller railway stations
Troon
Listed railway stations in Scotland
Category B listed buildings in South Ayrshire
2021 fires in the United Kingdom